Robert Lang may refer to: 

Robert Lang (ice hockey) (born 1970), Czech National Hockey League player
Robert Lang (cricketer) (1840–1908), cricketer
Robert Lang (cyclist) (1917–1997), Swiss cyclist
Robert Lang (rower) (born 1955), Australian Olympic rower
Robert Lang (swimmer) (born 1984), British swimmer at the 2007 World Championships
Robert A. Lang, American politician
Robert J. Lang (born 1961), American origami theorist and physicist
Robert Lang (actor) (1934–2004), English stage, television and film actor
Robert Lang, owner of Robert Lang Studios
Bob Lang, bassist in the 1960s band The Mindbenders
Robert Lang (producer), producer in Canada
Robert Lang (football manager) (1886–1941), Austrian football player and coach
Robert Hamilton Lang (1832–1913), Scottish-born financier, diplomat and collector of antiquities

See also 
Robert John "Mutt" Lange (born 1948), record producer and songwriter